Camillo Agrippa (died 1 January 1600) was a noted fencer, architect, engineer and mathematician of the Renaissance. He is considered to be one of the greatest fencing theorists of all time.

Biography
Though born in Milan, Agrippa lived and worked in Rome, where he was associated with the Confraternity of St. Joseph of the Holy Land and the literary and artistic circle around Cardinal Alessandro Farnese.

He is most renowned for applying geometric theory to solve problems in armed combat.  In his Treatise on the Science of Arms with Philosophical Dialogue (published in 1553), he proposed dramatic changes in the way swordsmanship was practised at the time. For instance, he pointed out the effectiveness of holding the sword in front of the body instead of behind it. He also simplified Achille Marozzo's eleven guards down to four: prima, seconda, terza and quarta, which roughly correspond to the hand positions used today in the Italian school. He is also regarded as the man who most contributed to the development of the rapier as a primarily thrusting weapon.

Agrippa was a contemporary of Michelangelo, and the two were probably acquainted (or so Agrippa claims in his later treatise on transporting the obelisk to the Piazza San Pietro). Based on an inscription in a copy of Agrippa quoted in the last edition of the bibliographic dictionary by Jacques Charles Brunet, Manuel du libraire et de l'amateur des livres (1860–64), some of the copperplate engravings for the book were attributed to Michelangelo, but modern art historians believe the unknown engraver is more likely to have come from the school of Marcantonio Raimondi.

There is evidence indicating that Agrippa's work may have been the inspiration for the Spanish school of swordplay (commonly referred to as Destreza).  Don Luis Pacheco de Narváez makes the claim that Don Jerónimo Sánchez de Carranza based his text on the work of Agrippa in a letter to the Duke of Cea in Madrid on 4 May 1618. This seems to be reinforced by a common use of geometry in both systems.

In popular culture 
Agrippa is mentioned in the film The Princess Bride during the swordplay scene above the Cliffs of Insanity when Inigo Montoya (Mandy Patinkin) and Westley (Cary Elwes) (then dressed as the Dread Pirate Roberts) engage each other in swordplay.  Early during the interchange, Westley theorizes that his Thibault effectively neutralizes Inigo's Capo Ferro technique, but Inigo counters, "unless the enemy has studied his Agrippa... which I have!"

Works by Agrippa

 
Trattato di transportare la guglia in su la piazza di s. Pietro
Treatise on the Science of Arms with Philosophical Dialogue.

References

External links
 
 
 The Number of Motion: Camillo Agrippa's Geometrical Fencing and the Enumeration of the Body - Academic article by Ken Mondschein.
Trattato Di Scientia d’ Arme,con un Dialogo di Filosofia - Treatise on the Science of Arms with Philosophical Dialogue. Online version in PDF
Dialogo del modo di mettere in battaglia - Dialogo di Camillo Agrippa milanese del modo di mettere in battaglia presto & con facilità il popolo di qual si voglia luogo con ordinanze & batagglie diverse. Online Version
 - Leonardo Lombardi, "Camillo Agrippa's Hydraulic Inventions on the Pincian Hill (1574-1578)", in Waters of Rome, Occasional Journal (5), 2008.
Ken Mondschein's English translation of Agrippa's Treatise on the Science of Arms.

Historical European martial arts
Swordfighters
16th-century Italian architects
Engineers from Rome
Italian male fencers
16th-century Italian mathematicians
Year of birth unknown
1600 deaths
Fencers from Milan